Jennifer Thompson is a former New Zealand discus thrower.

At the 1958 British Empire and Commonwealth Games she won the silver medal in the women's discus throw.

She also competed at the 1960 Olympic Games in the discus where she placed 13th overall.

External links
 
 

Year of birth missing (living people)
Living people
New Zealand female discus throwers
Commonwealth Games silver medallists for New Zealand
Commonwealth Games medallists in athletics
Athletes (track and field) at the 1958 British Empire and Commonwealth Games
Athletes (track and field) at the 1960 Summer Olympics
Olympic athletes of New Zealand
Medallists at the 1958 British Empire and Commonwealth Games